List of Provinces of Japan > Tosando > Rikuchu Province > Hienuki District

(Japan > Iwate Prefecture > Hienuki District)

 was a district located in Iwate Prefecture (formerly Rikuchu Province), Japan. The district had an estimated population of 23,027 and the total area is 365.41 km2.

By the time of founding, the district was co-teminous with the city of Hanamaki.

Until the day before the dissolution (December 31, 2005), there were only two towns left in the district.
 Ishidoriya
 Ōhasama

On January 1, 2006, the towns of Ishidoriya and Ōhasama, and the town of Tōwa (from Waga District) were merged into the expanded city of Hanamaki. Therefore, Hienuki District was dissolved as a result of this merger.

District Timeline
 April 1, 1889 - Due to the municipal status enforcement, the following municipalities were formed. (3 towns, 13 villages)
 The towns of Hanamaki, Hanamakikawaguchi and Ōhasama
 The villages of Yumoto, Miyanome, Yuguchi, Ōta, Neko, Yasawa, Uchikawame, Sotokawame, Kamegamori, Kōchi, Niibori, Yaehata and Hachiman
 June 1, 1923 - The town of Hanamakikawaguchi and the village of Neko were merged to form the town of Hanamakikawaguchi. (3 towns, 12 villages)
 April 1, 1928 -　The village of Kōchi was elevated to town status and renamed to become the town of Ishidoriya. (4 towns, 11 villages)
 April 10, 1929 - The towns of Hanamaki and Hanamakikawaguchi were merged to create the town of Hanamaki. (3 towns, 11 villages)
 April 1, 1954 - The town of Hanamaki, and the villages of Yumoto, Yuguchi, Yasawa, Ōta and Miyanome were merged to create the city of Hanamaki. (2 towns, 6 villages)
 January 1, 1955 - The town of Ōhasama, and the villages of Uchikawame, Sotokawame and Kamegamori merged to create the town of Ōhasama. (2 towns, 3 villages)
 April 1, 1955 - The town of Ishidoriya, and the villages of Niibori, Yaehata and Hachiman were merged to create the town of Ishidoriya. (2 towns)
 January 1, 2006 - The towns of Ōhasama and Ishidoriya, and the town of Tōwa (from Waga District) were merged into the expanded city of Hanamaki. Hienuki District was dissolved as a result of this merger.

See also

List of dissolved districts of Japan

District Hienuki
Former districts of Iwate Prefecture